The Herculis is an annual track and field meet at Stade Louis II in Fontvieille, Monaco. Previously one of the five IAAF Super Grand Prix events, it is now part of the Diamond League.

World records
Over the course of its history, five world records have been set at Herculis.

Meeting records

Men

Women

References

External links
 Diamond League – Monaco Official Web Site

Diamond League
IAAF Golden League
IAAF Super Grand Prix
Recurring sporting events established in 1987
IAAF World Outdoor Meetings
 
Athletics competitions in Monaco